RPG may refer to:

Military
 Rocket-propelled grenade, a shoulder-launched anti-tank weapon
Ruchnoi Protivotankoviy Granatomyot (Russian: Ручной Противотанковый Гранатомёт), hand-held anti-tank grenade launcher:
RPG-1
 RPG-2
 RPG-7
 RPG-16
 RPG-18
 RPG-22
 RPG-26
 RPG-27
 RPG-28
 RPG-29
 RPG-30
 RPG-32
 Ruchnaya Protivotankovaya Granata, hand-held anti-tank grenade:
 RPG-6
 RPG-40
 RPG-43
 Regulation prescription glasses, eyeglasses issued by the American military

Media and entertainment
 Role-playing game, in which players act out the roles of characters in a narrative game
 Role-playing video game, a type of video game
 RPG (film), a 2013 Portuguese science-fiction film
 "RPG", a song by Sekai no Owari
 "RPG", a song by Kehlani from her mixtape While We Wait

Organisations
 RPG Group, Indian business group
 RPG Life Sciences, Indian pharmaceutical company
 Rally of the Guinean People (Rassemblement du Peuple Guinéen), Guinean political party
 Ryanair Pilot Group, Ryanair pilots' trade union
 Recycled Paper Greetings, greeting card company based in Chicago, US

Science and technology
 IBM RPG, a computer programming language
 Retrograde pyelogram, a medical imaging procedure to visualize the urinary tract
 Ribosomal Protein Gene Database, see Eukaryotic small ribosomal subunit (40S)

Other uses
 Rebounds per game, of basketball rebounds

See also